Kay McShane (1948/1949 – 20 December 2019) was a former Irish wheelchair athlete. Her record of three consecutive wins in the 1984-1986 London Marathon women's wheelchair race remained unequaled for nearly 20 years until Francesca Porcellato tied the record in 2005 and then broke it in 2006. McShane competed in the 1984 and 1988 Summer Paralympics, in events ranging from the 800 metres to the marathon. She took a silver medal in the marathon in 1984, and two bronze medals in the marathon and 800 metres in 1988.

Kay McShane died on 20 December 2019, aged 70.

References

External links
 

Year of birth missing
1940s births
2019 deaths
Irish female wheelchair racers
Paralympic wheelchair racers
Paralympic athletes of Ireland
Paralympic silver medalists for Ireland
Paralympic bronze medalists for Ireland
Athletes (track and field) at the 1984 Summer Paralympics
Athletes (track and field) at the 1988 Summer Paralympics
Medalists at the 1984 Summer Paralympics
Medalists at the 1988 Summer Paralympics
Paralympic medalists in athletics (track and field)